Rachel Smith (born 3 January 1993) is a rhythmic gymnast. She has competed for Great Britain at European and World championships for rhythmic gymnastics as an individual gymnast and the GBR RG team and also captained the team which competed for Team GB at the 2012 Summer Olympics in London.

Early life
Smith was born on 3 January 1993 in Wyken, Coventry, England to father Robert Smith and mother Vanessa Smith. She attended Ravensdale Primary School, where she began her gymnastics career.

Gymnastics career
Smith started gymnastics at the age of 6 at Ravensdale Primary School, where she was spotted as talented and sent to the City of Coventry RGC, the local gymnastics club. From here she trialled for the Great Britain gymnastics squad located at Lilleshall National Sports Centre, where she was accepted into the performance squad at the age of 8. Smith competed in her first international competition in Russia when she was 9. She has competed at European and World Championships as both an individual and group competitor, as well as competing at the London 2012 Olympic Games.

References

1993 births
Living people
British rhythmic gymnasts
Olympic gymnasts of Great Britain
Gymnasts at the 2012 Summer Olympics
Sportspeople from Coventry
21st-century British women